Chamal Perera (born 4 September 1992) is a Sri Lankan cricketer. He made his first-class debut for Sebastianites Cricket and Athletic Club in Tier B of the 2019–20 Premier League Tournament on 31 January 2020. He made his Twenty20 debut on 5 March 2021, for Sebastianites Cricket and Athletic Club in the 2020–21 SLC Twenty20 Tournament.

References

External links
 

1992 births
Living people
Sri Lankan cricketers
Sebastianites Cricket and Athletic Club cricketers
Place of birth missing (living people)